In tennis, the ATP Masters is an annual series of nine top-level tennis tournaments featuring the elite men's tennis players on the ATP Tour. The tournaments are important for the top players on the professional circuit as the series constituted the most prestigious tournaments in men's tennis after the four Grand Slam events. The Masters series along with the Grand Slam tournaments, the ATP Finals championship and the Olympic Games are considered the top-tier events of men's tennis, referred to by the ATP as the "Big Titles".



Title leaders 

 Players with 6+ titles. Active players and tournament records indicated in bold.
 158 champions in 290 events as of 2023 Indian Wells.
 Masters' time slots indicated with 1st–9th column names.

Career Golden Masters 
The achievement of winning all of the nine active ATP Masters tournaments over the course of a player's career.

Career totals 
 Active players denoted in bold.

Season records

Consecutive records

Tournament records

Most titles per tournament

Tournaments won with no sets dropped

Calendar Masters combinations

Triples

Doubles

Title defence 
 Note: Currently active tournaments in bold.

Statistics

Seeds statistics

No. 1 vs. No. 2 seeds in final

Top 4 seeds in semifinals

Top 8 seeds in quarterfinals

Qualifiers in final

All countrymen in final

See also 

ATP Tour
 ATP Tour Masters 1000
 Tennis Masters Series singles records and statistics
 Grand Prix Super Series

WTA Tour
 WTA 1000
 WTA 1000 Series singles records and statistics
 WTA 1000 Series doubles records and statistics
 WTA Premier Mandatory and Premier 5
 WTA Tier I tournaments

References 

Masters
ATP Tour Masters 1000